Sawert Rocks is a group of rocks  east-northeast of Azimuth Island, and about  southwest of the Hansen Rocks, in the northeast part of Holme Bay, Mac. Robertson Land. Plotted from photos taken from ANARE (Australian National Antarctic Research Expeditions) aircraft in 1958. Named by Antarctic Names Committee of Australia (ANCA) for A. Sawert, radio officer at Mawson Station in 1959. Just to the east of the Sawert Rocks lies Nella Rock.

Rock formations of Mac. Robertson Land